Elections were held in the Regional Municipality of Peel of Ontario on October 25, 2010, in conjunction with municipal elections across the province.

Peel Regional Council

Brampton

Mayor

City and Regional Council

City Council

School Trustee

Caledon

Mayor

Regional and Town Council

Town Council

School Trustee, English Public

School Trustee, English Separate

School Trustee, French Separate

Mississauga

Mayor

City and Regional Council

School Trustee, English Public

School Trustee, English Separate

School Trustee, French Public

School Trustee, French Separate

References 

2010 Ontario municipal elections
Regional Municipality of Peel